Anthony A. Bellmon (born April 12, 1990) is a Democratic member of the Pennsylvania House of Representatives, representing the 203rd District since 2023.

External links

References 

Living people
Democratic Party members of the Pennsylvania House of Representatives
21st-century American politicians
1990 births